Alexandru Sergiu Grosu (born 16 May 1986, in Chișinău, Moldavian SSR) is a Moldovan football striker who currently plays for Zaria Bălți.

Honours
FC Tiraspol
Moldovan Cup: 2012/2013

Zimbru Chișinău
Moldovan Super Cup: 2014

References

External links
 
 Alexandru Sergiu Grosu at DiviziaNationala.com
 
 
 
 
 
 
 

1986 births
Footballers from Chișinău
Moldovan footballers
FC Rapid Ghidighici players
FC Tiraspol players
Living people
FC Zimbru Chișinău players
Association football forwards
Moldova international footballers